Simon Snootle and Other Small Stories is the first book of children’s short stories by Lorin Morgan-Richards. Published in 2009, the stories are described as being strange, gently absurd, wry, and dark whimsy.

Humor
While the stories contain dark humor the underlying themes play off of social awkwardness and individuality, and remind the reader to not take life too seriously. Richards introduces Simon Snootle who falls into his parents well with the neighborhood cats:
He is not aware of any tragedy of the situation, but rather makes the best of it, knowing that eventually, more things will fall in as he did.

He also writes of a boy named Boil who hides in a school bus cushion to be more like his pet earwig, Peter Puddlestick who has a life-changing moment when he happens upon a dead bird, a shrub that enjoys stealing hats and hairpieces, and Mr. Slowbug whose slow demeanor causes him to become a fashion accessory.

Illustration
Richards ink and graphite illustration style is considered reminiscent of Edward Gorey and Tim Burton.

Contents
 Simon Snootle was such a Gracious Host 
 Mr. Slowbug and Ms. Shellquick 
 Peter Puddlestick and the Precious Plot 
 The Life of Otto Loud 
 The Callous Shrub 
 The Earwig and Mrs. Snipit 
 The Boy Who Loved Beef Sandwiches

Editions
In 2009, Richards crafted the first edition of the book by hand using black faux leather for the hardback cover, and hand-sewn linen pages. The cover was foiled stamped with a cat logo designed by Richards. The second edition was also handmade by the author but the cover included a primarily yellow illustration of Simon Snootle in the well with the cats and a hose lowering down into it. Both of these editions were numbered and signed by the author and are collectible.
In 2016, Simon Snootle and Other Small Stories was released in paperback with a cover emphasizing the various stories as a whole featuring Ms. Shellquick, Simon Snootle and the child named Boil with his earwig.

Audiobook
Jason Shepherd narrated the audiobook with a special introduction by Jay & Jaywest, and Tae Sung Jie.

References

Comedy books
2009 children's books
American picture books
Black comedy books